Mike Keith may refer to:

 Mike Keith (sportscaster), American sports announcer, play by play voice of the Tennessee Titans
 Mike Keith (mathematician) (born 1955), American mathematician and writer

See also
 Michael Keith (disambiguation)
 Michael Edwin Keefe (1844–1933), building contractor and political figure in Nova Scotia, Canada
 Michael O'Keefe (disambiguation)